Carey S. Ryan is an American psychologist and professor emerita of psychology at the University of Nebraska at Omaha. She was also editor-in-chief of the Journal of Social Issues from 2017 to 2020. Topics that she has researched include differences between Americans and the Japanese with respect to perceptions of autonomy.

References

External links
Faculty page
Profile at Social Psychology Network

American social psychologists
Academic journal editors
University of Nebraska Omaha faculty
Living people
University of Nebraska Omaha alumni
University of Colorado Boulder alumni
American women psychologists
University of Nebraska–Lincoln alumni
Year of birth missing (living people)
American women academics
21st-century American women